Niz is a rural locality (a village) in Semizerye Rural Settlement, Kaduysky District, Vologda Oblast, Russia. The population was 6 as of 2002.

Geography 
Niz is located 14 km southwest of Kaduy (the district's administrative centre) by road. Korninskaya is the nearest rural locality.

References 

Rural localities in Kaduysky District